"When Something Is Wrong with My Baby" is a classic hit song, a soul ballad, written by Isaac Hayes and David Porter. It was first released in 1967 by Sam & Dave on Stax Records.

Original Sam & Dave version

Personnel
Vocals by Sam Moore and Dave Prater
Instrumentation by Booker T. & the M.G.'s and Mar-Keys Horns
Mastering Engineer – Rick O'Neil

In popular culture
 The song is featured in 2012 film Stand Up Guys, in a scene where Al Pacino asks a girl to dance with him.
 The song is featured in 1995 film Dead Presidents.
 The song is also featured in Edgar Wright's 2017 film, Baby Driver, in the scene where Bats forces Baby and the heist crew to go eat at Bo's Diner, where Baby's love interest Debora is working.

Charts

Johnny Gill version

In 1983, American contemporary R&B singer Johnny Gill covered "When Something Is Wrong with My Baby" and included it on his first eponymous album. The song was issued as the second and final single from the album; and it peaked at #57 on the Billboard R&B chart.

Charts

Jimmy Barnes and John Farnham version

In 1991, Australian singers Jimmy Barnes and John Farnham recorded and released "When Something Is Wrong with My Baby" as the second single from Barnes' fifth studio album, Soul Deep. Released in October 1991, the song peaked at number three in Australia and number six in New Zealand, where it is certified Gold for sales of over 5,000.

Track listing
CD single (D11048)
 "When Something Is Wrong With My Baby" – 4:56	
 "All I Got" (Jimmy Barnes) – 4:20

Charts

Weekly charts

Year-end charts

Certifications

Other versions
The song was covered by:
 Charlie Rich who recorded it on October 16, 1966, but first time released on the 1988 compilation album I'll Shed No Tears - The Best of the Hi Recordings.
 Otis Redding & Carla Thomas on their 1967 album King & Queen.
 Sonny James on his 1976 album Sonny James Sings When Something Is Wrong with My Baby.
 Hall & Oates with David Ruffin and Eddie Kendrick of the Temptations at their Apollo Theatre concert in New York City 1985 (appearing on their 1985 album Live at the Apollo).
 Linda Ronstadt and Aaron Neville as a Top Five duet in from the 1990 Triple Platinum album Cry Like a Rainstorm, Howl Like the Wind.
 Patti LaBelle and Travis Tritt on the 1994 various artists duets album Rhythm, Country and Blues.
 Frankie Miller has two live versions of the song recorded:
 On 6 May 1979 at the Internationale Maifestspiele Wiesbaden, Wiesbaden, Germany (on the live album Live at Rockpalast, recorded at WDR Studio, Cologne, Germany on 3.6.1976, in Wiesbaden, Germany in 6.5.1979, and Rockpalast Open Air Festival, Loreley, Germany on 28.8.1982, released in 2013).
 On 21 March 1979 at the Paris Theatre, London (on the live album BBC Radio One Live in Concert, recorded at the Paris Theatre, London on 3.5.1977, the Golders Green Hippodrome, London on 16.3.1978, and at the Paris Theatre, London on 21.3.1979, released in 1994).
 In 1985 it was covered live by Dutch band Herman Brood & His Wild Romance as "Something' Wrong" on their album Bühnensucht / Herman Brood Live.
 In April 1993, Phish covered the song at three of their concerts. The band has not played it live since then. 
 Guy Sebastian sung the song in a duet with Jimmy Barnes and original Stax band Booker T. & the MG's in Sydney, Australia during the Memphis Tour Concert (Friday, 7 March 2008).
 In 1985 a cover by American country music artist Joe Stampley from his album I'll Still Be Loving You peaked at number 67 on the Billboard Hot Country Singles chart.
 American folk-rock band Dawes (formed in 2009) has covered this song a multitude of times live, sung at some shows by Lenny Goldsmith, father of the band's drummer Griffin Goldsmith and vocalist/guitarist Taylor Goldsmith.

References

External links
 Sam & Dave - "When Something Is Wrong With My Baby" (1967) song review by Stewart Mason at AllMusic

1966 songs
1967 singles
1983 singles
1991 singles
Atlantic Records singles
Cotillion Records singles
Jimmy Barnes songs
Joe Stampley songs
John Farnham songs
Johnny Gill songs
Sam & Dave songs
Song recordings produced by Freddie Perren
Songs written by David Porter (musician)
Songs written by Isaac Hayes
Songs written for films
Stax Records singles
Male vocal duets